Geikie Ridge is a massive mountain ridge,  long and  wide, forming the divide between Dugdale Glacier and Murray Glacier in the Admiralty Mountains of Victoria Land, Antarctica. It was first charted by the British Antarctic Expedition, 1898–1900, under Carsten Borchgrevink, who named the high land between these glaciers "Geikie Land", after Sir Archibald Geikie (for whom Geikie Glacier and Geikie Inlet were also named). The generic "Land" has been changed to "Ridge", since it was not appropriate for so small a feature, but Borchgrevink's intent in naming the whole mass has been respected. This geographical feature lies situated on the Pennell Coast, a portion of Antarctica lying between Cape Williams and Cape Adare.

References

Ridges of Victoria Land
Pennell Coast